Ping Pong is a 2021 Chinese television series starring Bai Jingting and Xu Weizhou. The series centres around the lives of professional table tennis players and their journey to becoming representatives of the sport on the world stage. It begin to aired on iQiyi starting from 9 March 2021.

Synopsis
Endless competitions takes place on the ping pong tables with two young men at the center. Xu Tan is physically weak but strongly passionate and Yu Kenan is unruly but talented. Despite their opposite personalities, Xu Tan and Yu Kenan's mirror the same journey in their sports careers and witness a pivotal time in the history of Chinese ping pong. Xu Tan is a player who undergoes a major transformation. Under the influence of his grandfather, he starts the sport to improve his health and gets noticed for his abilities. Yu Kenan is the star player from a famous family who comes to realize that there are many things he has yet to learn. For their dreams and for the sake of their country, they stand at two ends during the biggest competition of their lives.

Cast

Main
Bai Jingting as Xu Tan
Xu Weizhou as Yu Kenan

Supporting
Yu Lang as Lei Lei
Hong Bingyao  as Zhang Caiwei
Wan Guopeng as Liu Shi
Bian Yiming as Fu Jingchun
Qin Yijia as Xiao Jun
Liu Yitie as Lu Xiaobei
Dong Chengming as Lin Haozhi
Yi Cheng as Zhang Chen

Production
The series began filming in November 2018 in Shenzhen, and wrapped up in May 2019.

References

Chinese sports television series
2021 Chinese television series debuts